The AC Greyhound (1959–1963) was a 2+2 version of the Ace and Aceca automobiles made by AC Cars of Thames Ditton, Surrey, England and announced for the opening of the Motor Show in October 1959. The Greyhound, of which 83 examples were built, had a two-door, four-seater aluminium body, and inherited most of the technical components of the Ace and Aceca but it had a wheelbase 10 inches or 250mm longer and coil springs in place of a transverse leaf spring at the front:

ladder-frame chassis
independent coil spring suspension front and rear. Unlike the Ace and Aceca the rear suspension used semi-trailing arms.
4-speed manual gearbox,  overdrive optional
rack and pinion steering;
 disc brake front,  drum brake rear

Various straight-six engines were fitted:
1.991-litre AC Cars OHC (75 bhp @ 4500 rpm; 1000 kg)
1.971-litre Bristol 100D2 OHV, (125 bhp @ 5750 rpm; 1015 kg)
2.216-litre Bristol (105 bhp @ 4700 rpm; 1093 kg)
2.553-litre Ford Zephyr (up to 170 bhp @ 5500; 1040 kg)

The test car cost £3185 including taxes.

References

Greyhound
Grand tourers
Cars introduced in 1959
1960s cars
Rear-wheel-drive vehicles
Coupés